More Dead Than Alive is a 1969 American Western film directed by Robert Sparr and produced by Aubrey Schenck. It was filmed at Agua Dulce, California.

Plot
A killer named Cain is released from prison after 18 years and wants to settle down as a rancher without ever having to touch a gun again. But no one will give him a job and people are after him for his earlier crimes.  He finally takes an offer from showman Ruffalo to perform as "Killer Cain" in his traveling shooting show. However, after 18 years without practice, Cain is not as good as he once was with a gun.  He tries to find redemption and peace when he falls in love and eventually marries Monica Alton, an artist from the east who came out west to paint.  Yet Cain's reputation continues to dog him; Luke Santee tries to settle an old score, while Billy Valence, a young rival sharpshooter (with mental issues) in Ruffalo's show, is looking to build his reputation by killing Cain. Billy snaps and shoots Ruffalo.

Principal cast

Critical reception
Reviewer Howard Thompson of The New York Times in 1969 praised the performances of Clint Walker and Anne Francis, but did not care for the movie, saying "More Dead Than Alive is a dogged but dinky little Western with the perfect title." He described Paul Hampton in the role of Billy as an "incredibly poor young actor" and concluded that "the title still fits: 'Dead' western."

See also
 List of American films of 1969

References

External links 
 
 

1969 Western (genre) films
1969 films
1960s American films
1960s English-language films
American Western (genre) films
Films about Wild West shows
Films directed by Robert Sparr
Films scored by Philip Springer
United Artists films